Khalopyenichy is an urban-type settlement in Krupki District, Minsk Region, Belarus.

History
First mentioned in 1451, Khalopyenichy belonged to Vitebsk Voivodeship of the Grand Duchy of Lithuania (from 1569, the Polish–Lithuanian Commonwealth), and later to Minsk Governorate of the Russian Empire.

Notable people
 Adam Bahdanovič (1862–1940), Belarusian ethnographer. Many of the folk tales and customs he recorded come from Khalopyenichy, and in particular from his maternal grandmother, the local storyteller Ruzala Aśmak.

Populated places in Minsk Region
Krupki District
Vitebsk Voivodeship
Borisovsky Uyezd